Doris Browne, Viscountess Castlerosse ( Delevingne; 25 September 1900  – 12 December 1942) was an English socialite and the first wife of Valentine Browne, 6th Earl of Kenmare.

Biography 
She was born Jessie Doris Delevingne in Streatham, South London, the eldest child and only daughter of British-born haberdasher of French origin Edward Charles Delevingne and Jessie Marian ( Homan). 

She entered the family business as a saleswoman of second-hand dresses, serving theatres in London, and as a result met the actress Gertrude Lawrence, who introduced her into London society. Her lovers prior to her marriage included Tom Mitford and American millionaire Stephen "Laddie" Sanford.

She met Valentine Browne, known by his title of Viscount Castlerosse, when he was working in London as a celebrity gossip columnist for the Sunday Express. They were married on 16 May 1928 and she was thereafter styled Viscountess Castlerosse, becoming familiarly known in society as Doris Castlerosse.  Soon afterwards she embarked on an affair with Randolph Churchill, son of the future prime minister.

Her other lovers included society photographer Cecil Beaton, and possibly Winston Churchill according to a British Channel 4 programme. Churchill had met Doris on holidays in the South of France at the Château de l’Horizon, a villa owned by actress Maxine Elliott. Doris was one of many women whose portraits were painted by Churchill. Churchill's former private secretary, Jock Colville, claimed in a 1985 interview with Correlli Barnett that Doris and the future Prime Minister had a four-year affair starting in 1933; however, Colville did not become Churchill’s private secretary until several years later in 1940, making the allegations at best second-hand information. Churchill scholar Andrew Roberts has rejected the likelihood that they had an affair, adding that "Lady Castlerosse was still legally married to Valentine Castlerosse at the time, the most waspish gossip columnist of the 1930s and the very last person an adulterer would have chosen to cuckold".

The viscount and viscountess were childless, and divorced in 1938. After naming her male friends and escorts as potential co-respondents, Viscount Castlerosse chose Robert Heber-Percy, a well-known homosexual whom she was allegedly trying to "cure". 

In 1940, Doris went to the United States, where she found it difficult to resume her earlier career as a courtesan. In 1942, she obtained Winston Churchill's assistance to return to Britain. On her return she was met by her ex-husband, who, according to some sources, hoped to make a fresh start in their relationship. In debt, no longer socially in demand and under police investigation for illegally selling diamonds, she died of an overdose of sleeping pills at the Dorchester Hotel on London’s Park Lane.

Through her brother Edward Dudley Delevingne, Doris was the great-aunt of models Poppy Delevingne and Cara Delevingne.

References

1900 births
1942 suicides
Drug-related suicides in England
British courtesy viscountesses
Doris
English people of French descent
People from London
1942 deaths